Giovanni Lapentti was the defending champion but chose not to participate.
Sebastián Decoud won the final against Daniel Muñoz-de la Nava 6–3, 7–6(7–3):

Seeds

Draw

Finals

Top half

Bottom half

References
 Main Draw
 Qualifying Draw

Cerveza Club Premium Open - Singles
2011 Singles